Miosis, or myosis, is excessive constriction of the pupil. The opposite condition, mydriasis, is the dilation of the pupil. Anisocoria is the condition of one pupil being more dilated than the other.

Causes

Age 
 Senile miosis (a reduction in the size of a person's pupil in old age)

Diseases 
 Horner's syndrome
 Hemorrhage into pons (intracranial hemorrhage)
 Hereditary disorders  
 Cluster headaches with ptosis
 Iridocyclitis
 Fatal familial insomnia
 Aphakia

Drugs 
 Opioids such as fentanyl, morphine, heroin and methadone (the notable exception being pethidine)
 Products containing nicotine such as cigarettes, chewing tobacco or gum.
 Imidazolines such as clonidine, naphazoline, oxymetazoline and tetrahydrozoline
 Antipsychotics, including risperidone, haloperidol, chlorpromazine, olanzapine, quetiapine
 Cholinergic agents such as acetylcholine  
 Acetylcholinesterase inhibitors
 Serotonin antagonists, such as Ondansetron (an anti-emetic) known by its brand name Zofran
 Some cancer chemotherapy drugs, including camptothecin derivatives
 Mirtazapine, a noradrenergic and specific serotonergic antidepressant (NaSSA)
 Some MAO Inhibitors.
 Pilocarpine eye drops and all other parasympathomimetics
 In some rare cases, when exposed to mustard gas
 Organophosphates

Physiology of the photomotor reflex
Light entering the eye strikes three different photoreceptors in the retina: the familiar rods and cones used in image forming and the more newly discovered photosensitive ganglion cells.  The ganglion cells give information about ambient light levels, and react sluggishly compared to the rods and cones.  Signals from photosensitive ganglion cells have multiple functions including acute suppression of the hormone melatonin, entrainment of the body's circadian rhythms and regulation of the size of the pupil.

The retinal photoceptors convert light stimuli into electric impulses.  Nerves involved in the resizing of the pupil connect to the pretectal nucleus of the high midbrain, bypassing the lateral geniculate nucleus and the primary visual cortex. From the pretectal nucleus neurons send axons to neurons of the Edinger-Westphal nucleus whose visceromotor axons run along both the left and right oculomotor nerves. Visceromotor nerve axons (which constitute a portion of cranial nerve III, along with the somatomotor portion derived from the Edinger-Westphal nucleus) synapse on ciliary ganglion neurons, whose parasympathetic axons innervate the iris sphincter muscle, producing miosis.

See also 

 Adie syndrome
 Argyll Robertson pupil
 Cycloplegia
 Glaucoma
 Marcus Gunn pupil
 Parinaud's syndrome
 Pupillary light reflex
 Syphilis

References

External links 

 FP Notebook

Medical signs
Ophthalmology